The Minister for Posts and Telegraphs was the holder of a position in the Government of Ireland (and, earlier, in the Executive Council of the Irish Free State). From 1924 until 1984 – when it was abolished – the minister headed the Department of Posts and Telegraphs (also known as the P&T in English and P⁊Ꞇ in Irish, and later stylised as p+t).

The office of Minister for Posts and Telegraphs was created by the Ministers and Secretaries Act 1924, which reorganised the Irish system of government shortly after the establishment of the Irish Free State in 1922. The Minister exercised those functions which had formerly been exercised by the Postmaster General of the United Kingdom. Legislation in 1831 had amalgamated the earlier offices of Postmaster General of Great Britain and Postmasters General of Ireland, which became a jointly held role in the administration of the Lord Lieutenant of Ireland.

The Ministers and Secretaries Act 1924 defined the department's role:

The Minister for Posts and Telegraphs was responsible for Ireland's postal and telecommunications services from 1924 to 1984. At its height the department was one of the largest civil service departments in Ireland. The reform of the sector and department began in 1978 with the creation of the Posts and Telegraphs Review Group. This led, following the delivery of a report in 1979, to the creation of the  Interim Board for Posts (An Bord Poist), chaired by Feargal Quinn, and the Interim Board for Telecommunications (An Bord Telecom), chaired by Michael Smurfit. These two boards continued to sit until An Post and Telecom Éireann, respectively, replaced them in 1984 as state-sponsored agencies.

History
The Department of Posts and Telegraphs ceased to exist in 1984, and its powers and responsibilities were transferred to the newly created Department of Communications. This was one of the largest reorganisations of the civil service in modern times, the old department having had a workforce of about 30,000 prior to dissolution. With the transfer of personnel to the new agencies, the number of civil service employees was almost halved overnight.

The Minister for Communications was created in 1983 to replace both the Minister for Posts and Telegraphs and the Minister for Transport. In 1987, the transport functions of the department were moved to a new Department of Tourism and Transport. In 1991 the minister's functions were passed to the renamed Minister for Tourism, Transport and Communications and the department ceased to exist, but was not formally abolished.

The functions which had initially been under the Minister for Communications are now under the Minister for the Environment, Climate and Communications, the Minister for Tourism, Culture, Arts, Gaeltacht, Sport and Media, and the Minister for Transport.

Alteration of name and transfer of functions

List of office-holders

Notes

List of Ministers of State
Under the Ministers and Secretaries Act 1924, the Executive Council could appoint Parliamentary Secretaries to assist Ministers in the Executive Council (renamed the Government in 1937). From 1978, this position was abolished and replaced by the position of Minister of State who could be appointed to a government department. The Minister of State did not hold cabinet rank.

References

Communications in the Republic of Ireland
Posts and Telegraphs
Republic of Ireland postal system
Telecommunications in the Republic of Ireland